Gastón Damián Aguirre (born 11 November 1981, in Adrogué) is an Argentine football defender who plays for San Martín de Burzaco.

Career
Aguirre started his playing career in 2000 with Temperley in the regionalised 3rd division of Argentine football. In 2002, he joined Olimpo de Bahía Blanca of the Argentine Primera and at the end of the season he joined Newell's Old Boys of Rosario. Aguirre joined San Lorenzo in 2007 and established himself as a regular first team player.

Aguirre gained notoriety in late 2008, when during a match between Tigre and San Lorenzo, he accidentally hit a group of pigeons standing on the field, and one of the birds was killed by the impact of the shot.

References

External links
 Argentine Primera statistics 
 Football-Lineups player profile
 

1981 births
Living people
People from Adrogué
Argentine people of Basque descent
Argentine footballers
Association football defenders
Club Atlético Temperley footballers
Olimpo footballers
Newell's Old Boys footballers
San Lorenzo de Almagro footballers
Argentine Primera División players
Sportspeople from Buenos Aires Province